Steven Laureys (born 24 December 1968 in Leuven) is a Belgian neurologist. He is principally known as a clinician and researcher in the field of neurology of consciousness.

Career
Prof. Laureys graduated as a Medical Doctor from the Vrije Universiteit Brussel, Belgium, in 1993. While specializing in neurology he entered a research career and obtained his MSc in Pharmaceutical Medicine working on pain and stroke using in vivo microdialysis and diffusion MRI in the rat (1997). Drawn by functional neuroimaging, he moved to the Cyclotron Research Center at the University of Liège, Belgium, where he obtained his PhD studying residual brain function in the vegetative state in 2000. He is board-certified in neurology (1998) and in end-of-life and palliative medicine (2004).

He currently leads the Coma Science Group at the Cyclotron Research Centre of the University of Liège, Belgium. He is clinical professor of neurology, at the Liège University Hospital and Research Director at the National Fund for Scientific Research.

Laureys is chair of the World Federation of Neurology's Coma and Disorders of Consciousness Research Group and of the European Neurological Society's Subcommittee on Coma and Disorders of Consciousness. Since 2009, he is invited professor at the Royal Academy of Belgium. In 2010, he was invited to give a research lecture at Nobel Forum.

Research
His team assesses the recovery of neurological disability and of neuronal plasticity in severely brain damaged patients with altered states of consciousness by means of multimodal functional neuroimaging. It aims at characterizing the brain structure and the residual cerebral function in patients who survive a severe brain injury: patients in coma, vegetative state, minimally conscious state and locked in syndrome.

The importance of this project is twofold. First, these patients represent a problem in terms of diagnosis, prognosis, treatment and daily management. Second, these patients offer the opportunity to explore human consciousness, which is presently one major conundrum neurosciences have to solve. Indeed, these patients present a complete, nearly graded, range of conscious states from unconsciousness (coma) to full awareness (locked-in syndrome).

This research confronts clinical expertise and bedside behavioral evaluation of altered states of consciousness with state-of-the-art multimodal imaging combining the information from positron emission tomography (PET), functional magnetic resonance imaging (fMRI), structural MRI, electroencephalography (EEG), event related potential (ERP) and transcranial magnetic stimulation (TMS) data.

Selected publications 
 "A theoretically based index of consciousness independent of sensory processing and behavior", Casali AG, Gosseries O, Rosanova M, Boly M, Sarasso S, Casali KR, Casarotto S, Bruno MA, Laureys S, Tononi G, Massimini M. Science Translational Medicine 5 (2013)
 "Pupil responses allow communication in locked-in syndrome patients", Stoll J, Chatelle C, Carter O, Koch C, Laureys S, Einhäuser W. Current Biology 23 (2013) R647–648
 "Disorders of consciousness: responding to requests for novel diagnostic and therapeutic interventions", Jox RJ, Bernat JL, Laureys S, Racine E. Lancet Neurology 11 (2012) 732–738
 "Bedside detection of awareness in the vegetative state: a cohort study", Cruse D, Chennu S, Chatelle C, Bekinschtein TA, Fernández-Espejo D, Pickard JD, Laureys S, Owen AM. Lancet 278 (2011) 2088–2094
 "Willful modulation of brain activity in disorders of consciousness", Monti MM, Vanhaudenhuyse A, Coleman MR, Boly M, Pickard JD, Tshibanda L, Owen AM, Laureys S. New England Journal of Medicine 362 (2010) 579–589
 "The changing spectrum of coma", Laureys S, Boly M, Nature Clinical Practice Neurology 4 (2008) 544–546
 "Perception of pain in the minimally conscious state with PET activation: an observational study", Boly M, Faymonville ME, Schnakers C, Peigneux P, Lambermont B, Phillips C, Lancellotti P, Luxen A, Lamy M, Moonen G, Maquet P, Laureys S, Lancet Neurology, 7 (2008) 1013–1020
 "Baseline brain activity fluctuations predict somatosensory perception in humans", Boly M, Balteau E, Schnakers C, Degueldre C, Moonen G, Luxen A, Phillips C, Peigneux P, Maquet P, Laureys S Proceedings of the National Academy of Sciences (USA), 104 (2007) 12187–12192
 "Detecting awareness in the vegetative state", Owen AM, Coleman MR, Boly M, Davis MH, Laureys S, Pickard J Science 313 (2006) 1402
 "Death, unconsciousness and the brain", Laureys S Nature Reviews Neuroscience, 11 (2005) 899–909
 "Brain function in coma, vegetative state, and related disorders", Laureys S, Owen A, Schiff N, Lancet Neurology 3 (2004) 537–46
 "Restoration of thalamocortical connectivity after recovery from persistent vegetative state", Laureys S, Faymonville ME, Luxen A, Lamy M, Franck G, Maquet P, Lancet 355 (2000) 1790–1791
 The Neurology of Consciousness, ed. Laureys S and Tononi G, Academic Press, New York, 2008 
 The boundaries of consciousness, ed. Laureys S, Elsevier, Amsterdam, 2006

See also 
 Rom Houben, a comatose man incorrectly identified as conscious by Laureys, who made insufficiently rigorous tests of alleged facilitated communication

References

External links
 Coma Science Group (with downloadable papers)
 Steven Laureys' page at the University of Liège
 Cyclotron Research Centre
 Liège University Hospital

1968 births
Living people
Belgian neuroscientists
Belgian consciousness researchers and theorists
Cognitive neuroscientists
Materialists
Belgian medical writers
Belgian science writers
Electroencephalographers